"Oh, What a Night" is a song first recorded by the doo-wop group the Dells and released in 1956, originally under the title "Oh What a Nite". It is said to have been inspired by a party, which had been held in the Dells' honor by some female friends of the group.

Reception
The Dells' original recording on the Vee Jay label peaked at #4 on the R&B singles chart. In 1969, they refashioned it as a soul song on the Cadet label. The August 2, 1969 edition of Record World gave it a "Four Star Pick" review, stating: "This old, old, old, oldie sounds newer than tomorrow, via the Dells chartbreaker express. All will dig." The new "Oh, What a Night" was notably different from its original counterpart with an altered arrangement and tempo, and included a spoken recitation, in the introduction, from bass singer Chuck Barksdale. This new version reached #10 on the Billboard Hot 100 singles chart and #1 on the Best Selling Soul singles chart.

The 1969 version was ranked #260 on Rolling Stone's list of The 500 Greatest Songs of All Time.

"Oh, What a Night" was subsequently recorded by Sly Stone & the Biscaynes (1978), Tracey Ullman (1983), Lester Bowie (1986), the Moonlighters (1988), Nick Kamen (1988), Barbara Jones (1995), Donnie & the Del Chords (1999), and Unisoghn (2001).

Personnel

1950s version
Lead vocals by Johnny Funches and Marvin Junior
Background vocals by Johnny Funches, Marvin Junior, Michael McGill, Chuck Barksdale and Verne Allison

1960s version
Lead vocals by Junior Marvin (Marvin Junior) and Johnny Carter 
Background vocals by Johnny Carter, Michael McGill, Chuck Barksdale and Verne Allison
Spoken intro by Chuck Barksdale
Produced by Bobby Miller

References

External links
Rock and Roll Hall of Fame inductee page
Songfacts: "Oh What a Nite" page
[ Song review and list of albums the song appears on]
[ Change - Sharing Your Love (1982)]
Change information, bio, discography and track lists

1956 singles
1969 singles
Doo-wop songs
1956 songs
Cadet Records singles